Utah is the 30th most populous state in the United States with a population of about 3.3 million, according to projections from the US Census Bureau's 2017 estimates. The state has also been characterized by a tremendous amount of growth in the last decade, with the highest percent increase in population of any state since 2010. Utah has a surface area of 84,899 square miles, though around 80% of its population is concentrated around a metropolitan area in the north-central part of the state known as the Wasatch Front.

Population

The United States Census Bureau estimates that the population of Utah was 3,205,958 on July 1, 2019, a 16.00% increase since the 2010 United States census.

The center of population of Utah is located in Utah County in the city of Lehi. As of April 1, 2010 the 2010 census indicated that Utah had a population of 2,763,885. In 2008, the U.S. Census Bureau determined Utah was the fastest-growing state in the country.

Much of the population lives in cities and towns along the Wasatch Front, a metropolitan region that runs north–south with the Wasatch Mountains rising on the eastern side. Growth outside the Wasatch Front is also increasing. The St. George metropolitan area is currently the second fastest-growing in the country after the Las Vegas metropolitan area, while the Heber micropolitan area is also the second fastest-growing in the country (behind Palm Coast, Florida).

Utah contains five metropolitan areas (Logan, Ogden-Clearfield, Salt Lake City, Provo-Orem, and St. George), and four micropolitan areas (Heber, Vernal, Price, and Cedar City).

Birth data
Note: Births in table don't add up, because Hispanics are counted both by their ethnicity and by their race, giving a higher overall number.

Since 2016, data for births of White Hispanic origin are not collected, but included in one Hispanic group; persons of Hispanic origin may be of any race.

Ancestry

According to 2010 United States census projections, the racial and ethnic makeup of Utah are as follows:

 88.6% White or European
 2.8% Asian American
 1.8% American Indians and Alaskan Natives
 1.6% African American
 1.3% Pacific Islander
 6.9% Some other race
 13% Hispanic/Latino (of any race)

The largest ancestry groups in the state are:

 27.7% English
 14.9% Scandinavian: (5.9% Danish, 4.3% Swedish, & 2.4% Norwegian)
 12.4% German
 7.0% American
 6.1% Irish
 4.7% Scottish
 2.9% Italian
 2.2% French
 2.2% Welsh
 1.4% Scotch Irish
 1.3% Swiss

Utah County has the largest Icelandic American population, while Sanpete County is about a fifth (17%) Danish American. Swedish Americans and Norwegian Americans outnumbered English American ancestry in Central Utah (i.e. Heber City). Finnish Americans, Russian Americans and Ukrainian Americans are significant in number throughout the state (esp. Carbon County, Utah and Wasatch County, Utah areas). The Wikipedia article Utah Italians describes the state's small but established Italian-American community. And the percentage of persons of Spanish American ancestry including those of Basque descent are also present.
Most Utahns are of Northern European descent.

In the 2010 census estimates, 89.2% of the state population is white and European American. 
Hispanics are the next largest group with 13.0%, followed by Asians at 1.7% and Native American at 1.3%. The largest Latino group is Mexican.

Religion

As of 2020, 60.68% of Utahns are reported as members of The Church of Jesus Christ of Latter-day Saints. The LDS Church has historically reported membership numbers for the state of Utah but did not do so in 2021; a church spokesperson said this was because the numbers they had did not "accurately reflect membership numbers and trends" so the current number of members that the LDS church claims in Utah is unknown. Latter-day Saints make up about 49% (28% active) of the population in Salt Lake County, making it the fifth minority LDS county in the state, joining Carbon, San Juan, Summit, and Grand. Salt Lake County Latter-day Saints mainly reside in the southern part of the valley (Draper, South Jordan, and parts of West Jordan). Rural areas tend to have larger proportions of LDS, but nearly all counties have seen decreasing percentages affiliated with the church since 2009. Several explanations have been given to explain this decrease, such as relocation, members resigning, and a decreasing birth rate in the state. However, contrary to the declining membership trend, Utah County, home of Brigham Young University, has seen a modest uptick in membership since 2009 to nearly 85%, making it second only to Morgan County at 86.1%.

Though The Church of Jesus Christ of Latter-day Saints officially maintains a policy of neutrality in regards to political parties, the church's doctrine has a strong regional influence on politics. Another doctrine effect can be seen in Utah's high birth rate (25 percent higher than the national average; the highest for a state in the U.S.). The Latter-day Saints in Utah tend to have conservative views when it comes to most political issues and the majority of voter-age Utahns are unaffiliated voters (60%) who vote overwhelmingly Republican. John McCain polled 62.5% in the 2008 presidential election while 70.9% of Utahns opted for George W. Bush in 2004. In 2000, the Religious Congregations and Membership Study reported that the three largest denominational groups in Utah are Latter-day Saint, Catholic, and Evangelical Protestant. The LDS Church has the highest number of adherents in Utah (at 1,493,612 members), followed by the Catholic Church with 97,085 members reported and the Southern Baptist Convention, reporting 13,258 adherents. According to a report produced by the Pew Forum on Religion & Public Life, the self-identified religious affiliations of Utahns over the age of 18 as of 2014 are:

 Christianity 73%
Church of Jesus Christ of Latter-day Saints 55%
 Evangelicals 7%
 Mainline Protestants 6%
 Catholic 5%
 Black Protestant Churches <1%
 Jehovah's Witnesses <1%
 Eastern Orthodox <1%
 Other Christian <1%
 Unaffiliated 22%
 Nothing in particular 18%
 Atheist 3%
 Agnostic 2%
 Non-Christian Faiths 4%
 Islam 1%
 Buddhism 1%
 Hinduism <1%
 Judaism <1%
 Other World Religions 1%

Culture

Recently, Utah has experienced an in-migration of population from other U.S. states which served to change the state's sociocultural/political character. The percentage of Utah residents who are LDS has declined while the number of the religiously unaffiliated has increased.

The warmer climate and temperate medium-elevation areas of Iron, Juab, Millard, Sanpete and Washington counties record population growth rates from the 1980s to early 2010s.

The state witnessed some splits, and sects of Mormonism are evident: Bickertonites, Church of Christ and ex-Mormons; and the FLDS fundamentalist communes in the rural communities like Hildale in southernmost Utah and the nearby towns of Colorado City, Arizona and Fredonia, Arizona adjacent to the Arizona Strip on the state boundary with Arizona.

Also there is an active lesbian, gay, bisexual and transgender community which thrives in the Salt Lake metropolitan area. The national LGBT magazine The Advocate ranked Salt Lake City as one of the nation's 50 hot spots for the subculture in 2005.

Utah has a high total birth rate, and the youngest population of any U.S. state.

In 2000, 49.9% female and 50.1% male constituted the gender makeup of Utah.

Obesity rate
The age-adjusted percentage of Utah adults who were obese increased from 19.5% in 2000 to 28.4% in 2018. Utah ranked 40th among the 50 states and the District of Columbia.

References

 
Utah